The 1968 All-Pacific-8 Conference football team consists of American football players chosen by the Associated Press (AP), the United Press International (UPI), and the Pacific-8 Conference (Pac-8) coaches (Coaches) as the best college football players by position in the Pac-8 during the 1968 NCAA University Division football season.

The 1968 USC Trojans football team won the Pac-8 championship, were ranked No. 2 in the final Coaches Poll, and placed eight players on the first team: quarterback Steve Sogge (AP-1, UPI-1, Coaches-1); running back O. J. Simpson (AP-1, UPI-1, Coaches-1); end Bob Klein (AP-1, UPI-1, Coaches-1); offensive tackle Sid Smith (AP-1, Coaches-1); offensive guards Fred Khasigian (AP-1, Coaches-1) and Steve Lehmer (UPI-1); defensive end Jimmy Gunn (AP-1, UPI-1, Coaches-1); and defensive back Mike Battle (UPI-1).

Offensive selections

Quarterbacks
 Steve Sogge, USC (AP-1; UPI-1; Coaches-1)
 Jim Plunkett, Stanford (UPI-2)

Running backs
 Bill Enyart, Oregon State (AP-1; UPI-1; Coaches-1)
 O. J. Simpson, USC (AP-1; UPI-1; Coaches-1)
 Gene Washington, Stanford (AP-1; UPI-1)
 Billy Main, Oregon State (UPI-2)
 Greg Jones, UCLA (UPI-2)
 Carl Wojciechowski, Washington (UPI-2)

Ends
 Bob Klein, USC (AP-1; UPI-1; Coaches-1)
 Wayne Stewart, California (AP-1; UPI-1; Coaches-1)
 Ron Souza, Washington State (AP-2; UPI-2)
 Roger Cantlon, Oregon State (AP-2)
 Ron Copeland, UCLA (UPI-2)

Tackles
 Malcolm Snider, Stanford (AP-1; UPI-1; Coaches-1)
 Sid Smith, USC (AP-1; Coaches-1)
 Roger Stalick, Oregon State (AP-2; UPI-1)
 Dave Golinsky, Washington State (AP-2)
 Jack O'Malley, USC (UPI-2)
 George Buehler, Stanford (UPI-2)

Guards
 Fred Khasigian, USC (AP-1; UPI-2; Coaches-1)
 Clyde Smith, Oregon State (AP-2; Coaches-1)
 Steve Lehmer, USC (AP-2; UPI-1)
 Nick Shur, Oregon (AP-1)
 Rocky Rasley, Oregon State (UPI-1)
 Jim Harris, Washington (UPI-2)

Centers
 John Didion, Oregon State (AP-1; UPI-1; Coaches-1)
 Dick Allmon, USC (AP-2; UPI-2)

Defensive selections

Defensive ends
 Jimmy Gunn, USC (AP-1; UPI-1; Coaches-1)
 Mike McCaffrey, California (AP-1; UPI-2; Coaches-1)
 Irby Augustine, California (AP-2; UPI-1)
 Otis Washington, Washington (AP-2; UPI-2)

Defensive tackles
 Larry Agajanian, UCLA (AP-1; UPI-1; Coaches-1)
 Jon Sandstrom, Oregon State (AP-1; UPI-1; Coaches-1)
 Ron Boley, Oregon State (AP-2; UPI-2)
 Tony Terry, USC (AP-2)
 Al Cowlings, USC (UPI-2)

Middle guard
 Ed White, California (AP-1; UPI-1; Coaches-1)
 George Dames, Oregon (AP-1; Coaches-1; UPI-2)
 George Buehler, Stanford (AP-2)
 Steve Bartelie, Washington State (AP-2)

Linebackers
 George Jugum, Washington (AP-1; UPI-1; Coaches-1)
 Don Parish, Stanford (AP-1; UPI-1; Coaches-1)
 Mike Ballou, UCLA (AP-2; UPI-2)
 Dennis Pitta, California (AP-2)

Defensive backs
 Ken Wiedemann, California (AP-1; UPI-1 Coaches-1)
 Al Worley, Washington (AP-1; UPI-1; Coaches-1)
 Omri Hildreth, Oregon (AP-2 [defensive back]; Coaches-1 [defensive back]; UPI-2 [linebacker])
 Mark Gustafson, UCLA (AP-2; UPI-1)
 Mike Battle, USC (UPI-1)
 Mike Williams, Washington State (AP-1)
 Charlie Olds, Oregon State (AP-2)
 Rudy Redmond, Pacific (UPI-2)
 Rick Reed, Washington State (UPI-2)
 Steve Hilbert, Oregon (UPI-2)

Key
AP = Associated Press

UPI = United Press International

Coaches = selected by the eight head coaches of the Pacific-8 Conference

See also
1968 College Football All-America Team

References

All-Pacific-8 Conference Football Team
All-Pac-12 Conference football teams